Synasellus is a genus of isopod crustaceans in the family Asellidae. It contains the following species:
 Synasellus albicastrensis Braga, 1960
 Synasellus barcelensis Noodt & Galhano, 1969
 Synasellus bragai Afonso, 1987
 Synasellus bragaianus Henry & Magniez, 1987
 Synasellus brigantinus Braga, 1959
 Synasellus capitatus (Braga, 1968)
 Synasellus dissimilis Afonso, 1987
 Synasellus exiguus Braga, 1944
 Synasellus favaiensis Eiras, 1974
 Synasellus flaviensis Afonso, 1996
 Synasellus fragilis Braga, 1946
 Synasellus henrii Afonso, 1987
 Synasellus hurki Henry & Magniez, 1995
 Synasellus insignis Afonso, 1984
 Synasellus intermedius Afonso, 1985
 Synasellus lafonensis Braga, 1959
 Synasellus leysi Henry & Magniez, 1995
 Synasellus longicauda Braga, 1959
 Synasellus longicornis Afonso, 1978
 Synasellus mariae (Braga, 1942)
 Synasellus mateusi Braga, 1954
 Synasellus meijersae Henry & Magniez, 1987
 Synasellus meirelesi Braga, 1959
 Synasellus minutus Braga, 1967
 Synasellus nobrei Braga, 1967
 Synasellus notenboomi Henry & Magniez, 1987
 Synasellus pireslimai Braga, 1959
 Synasellus pombalensis Afonso, 1987
 Synasellus robusticornis Afonso, 1987
 Synasellus serranus Braga, 1967
 Synasellus tirsensis Afonso, 1987
 Synasellus transmontanus Braga, 1959
 Synasellus valpacensis Afonso, 1996
 Synasellus vidaguensis Afonso, 1996
 Synasellus vilacondensis Afonso, 1987

References

Asellota